Emergency – Ward 9 is a Dennis Potter television play first broadcast on BBC1 in the Thirty-Minute Theatre series on 11 April 1966.

Potter had praised the storylines and sense of urgency of the ITV hospital soap Emergency – Ward 10 in his television reviews for the Daily Herald. He was inspired to write a play that connected his experiences in a National Health hospital with events depicted in the series. Potter's script specifies an "Alf Garnett-type" character who suddenly finds himself sharing a ward with a black man. The play was controversial for its unflinching depiction of institutionalised racism but was critically applauded.

The play was repeated eighteen months after its first transmission. For many years, a recording was thought not to have survived, but a recording of the play resurfaced and was screened at the BFI's Missing Believed Wiped event in December 2011.

References

1966 television plays
BBC television dramas
Television shows written by Dennis Potter